KBS may refer to:

Places
KBS Tuff, Kenyan archaeological site
Kellogg Biological Station
Kent Business School, University of Kent, UK

Radio and television
Kansas Broadcasting System, network of KWCH, Wichita, Kansas, US
Korean Broadcasting System, South Korea
Kyoto Broadcasting System, once Kinki Broadcasting System

Transportation
Kempegowda Bus Station
Kankakee, Beaverville and Southern Railroad
Kursbuchstrecke (timetabled routes), KBS codes given to scheduled railway routes in Germany

Technology
kB/s, kilobytes per second
Knowledge-based systems, an application of artificial intelligence to solve reasoning problems

Other uses
Kansas Bankers Surety Company
Founders Brewing Kentucky Breakfast Stout
King Baudouin Foundation (Dutch: Koning Boudewijnstichting)

See also
 KB (disambiguation) for the singular of KBs
 KBS 1 (disambiguation)
 KBS 2 (disambiguation)
 KBS 3 (disambiguation)